Idiodes is a genus of moths in the family Geometridae first described by Achille Guenée in 1858.

Species
Some species of this genus are:
Idiodes albilinea (Thierry-Mieg, 1907)
Idiodes albistriga (Warren, 1899)
Idiodes andravahana Viette, 1968
Idiodes andriana Viette, 1968
Idiodes andrivola Viette, 1968
Idiodes apicata Guenée, 1857 (Australia)
Idiodes avelona Viette, 1968
Idiodes fletcherana Viette, 1968
Idiodes flexilinea (Warren, 1898)
Idiodes gracilipes Herbulot, 1954
Idiodes herbuloti (Viette, 1981)
Idiodes idiocrossa (Turner, 1947) (Australia)
Idiodes oberthueri (Dognin, 1911)
Idiodes pectinata (Herbulot, 1966)
Idiodes radiata Herbulot, 1957
Idiodes saxaria (Guenée, 1858)
Idiodes siculoides Walker (1860) (Australia)

References

Lithinini